The 1908 Wisconsin Badgers football team represented the University of Wisconsin as a member of the Western Conference during the 1908 college football season. Led by first-year head coach Thomas A. Barry, the Badgers compiled an overall record of 5–1 with a mark of 2–1 in conference play, placing third in the Western Conference. The team's captain was Harlan Rogers. The final game of the season was the first homecoming game in program history. The Badgers were defeated, 18–12, by the Chicago Maroons.

Schedule

References

Wisconsin
Wisconsin Badgers football seasons
Wisconsin Badgers football